The Lac Sept Îles (sometimes spelled Lac aux Sept-Isles) (English: Seven Islands Lake) is a body of water located in the township of Gosford, in the municipality of Saint-Raymond, in the Portneuf Regional County Municipality, in the administrative region of Capitale-Nationale, in Quebec, in Canada.

Thanks to its forest and mountain environment, its islands and bays, its proximity to Quebec city, and the Duchesnay tourist resort, the area around the lake is highly developed. A road completely surrounds the lake to serve residents and vacationers, an activity that dates to 1857–1858, compared to 1896 at Sergent Lake.

Geography 
Lake Sespt-Îles is mainly supplied by three tributaries:
 northeast: the Lac au Chien pass ( long) which links Lac au Chien (altitude of ) and lake Sept Îles. Lac au Chien itself is fed by Lac à la Perche, Lac du Ventre Rouge, Lac des Roches, Lac Maher and Lac aux Deux Truites;

Lake Sept-Îles is surrounded by mountain peaks that reach:
 north: between 
 south-east: between 
 south: between 
 west: 

The lake has several bays including Vachon Bay (to the southeast). The mouth of the lake is located southwest of the lake. The outlet of the lake is the Portneuf River which flows southwest to the town of Portneuf where its waters flow into the St. Lawrence River.

Toponymy 
The lake is aptly named because it has exactly seven islands, three islands and four islets. Colonization around the lake began around 1857–1858; eleven families were listed there in 1861, while the population of Saint-Raymond was then 2,902 inhabitants. During the 20th century, the perimeter of the lake was fitted out with numerous houses and chalets. The island of Genois, the largest and not accessible by road, has around twenty homes. The other islands contain some habitations.

The toponym “Lac Sept Îles” was formalized on December 5, 1968, at the Bank of Place Names of the Commission de toponymie du Québec.

References 

Lakes of Capitale-Nationale